Jake Eldrenkamp (born March 4, 1994) is an American football guard who is a free agent. He was signed by the Los Angeles Rams as an undrafted free agent in 2017 following his college football career with the Washington Huskies, and has also been a member of the Cleveland Browns and New England Patriots.

College career
Eldrenkamp spent four seasons at Washington. As a senior, he garnered First-team All-Pac-12 honors and was named the Pac-12 Football Scholar Athlete of the Year.

Professional career

Los Angeles Rams
Eldrenkamp signed with the Los Angeles Rams as an undrafted free agent following the 2017 NFL Draft on April 29, 2017. He was waived during final roster cuts on September 2, 2017, and signed to the team's practice squad the next day. He was released on September 12, and re-signed to the practice squad on November 15.

Eldrenkamp signed a reserve/futures contract with the Rams after the 2017 season on January 8, 2018. He was waived at the end of training camp on August 31, 2018.

Cleveland Browns
Eldrenkamp signed to the Cleveland Browns' practice squad on October 16, 2018. He was released on November 7, and re-signed to the practice squad on November 30.

New England Patriots
Eldrenkamp signed a reserve/futures contract with the New England Patriots on February 5, 2019, but was waived before the start of training camp on May 20, 2019.

Indianapolis Colts
Eldrenkamp was claimed off waivers by the Indianapolis Colts on May 21, 2019. He was waived during final roster cuts on August 31, 2019, and signed to the team's practice squad the next day. He was promoted to the active roster on December 14, 2019.

Eldrenkamp was waived again during final roster cuts on September 5, 2020, and re-signed to the team's practice squad the next day. He was elevated to the active roster on October 10, October 17, and December 26 for the team's weeks 5, 6, and 16 games against the Cleveland Browns, Cincinnati Bengals, and Pittsburgh Steelers, and reverted to the practice squad after each game. On January 10, 2021, Eldrenkamp signed a reserve/futures contract with the Colts.

On August 31, 2021, Eldrenkamp was waived by the Colts.

New England Patriots (second stint)
On September 22, 2021, the Patriots signed Eldrenkamp to their practice squad, but was released three days later.

Houston Texans
On October 5, 2021, Eldrenkamp was signed to the Houston Texans practice squad. He signed a reserve/future contract with the Texans on January 11, 2022. The Texans waived Eldrenkamp on March 22, 2022.

References

External links
Indianapolis Colts bio
Washington Huskies football bio

1994 births
Living people
American football offensive guards
Washington Huskies football players
Los Angeles Rams players
Cleveland Browns players
New England Patriots players
People from Medina, Washington
Players of American football from Washington (state)
Sportspeople from King County, Washington
Indianapolis Colts players
Houston Texans players